The Ford SYNus is a concept car produced by Ford and created by the Spanish designer Jose Paris (exterior design) and Joe Baker (interior). The SYNus debuted at the 2005 North American International Auto Show.

The unusual name, which is pronounced "sin-you-ehs", comes from the words synthesis (synthesis of the tough exterior and the soft interior) and US, which stands for Urban Sanctuary. Its name is a homophone of sinuous, which means curving, or graceful.

Design 

The design mimics that of an armadillo, in that it has a tough exterior and a soft interior. Armadillo was a working title of the SYNus, but was discarded when it was discovered that there was another concept car from Fiat with this title. Other production names have included "Ford Knox" and "Gorilla". 

The SYNus shares its powertrain design with the Ford Mondeo.  The engine is a diesel powered, 16 valve, turbocharged, 2.0L DOHC 4-cylinder Duratorq TDCi Diesel engine that produces 134 horsepower (100 kW). The SYNus has a five-speed manual transmission. Its wheels are 18 inches (457 mm) in diameter. It has an IEEE 802.11g compliant wireless LAN hub. 
The SYNus was designed to maximize safety, and derives its aesthetic from modern bank vaults. The car's windows and frame are bullet-resistant. It has no rear window, and instead displays a video feed on a large LCD monitor installed in the back of the car's interior. Also, when in "lockdown mode" steel shutters close around the front windshield, windows and the exterior lights.

The car also, as mentioned earlier, is an "Urban Sanctuary". When in "lockdown mode", the car's seats can be configured to face rearwards, to watch movies or relax in otherwise hectic city life. In this sense, the car can be used to shut out the outside world.

References

External links 
 Article at HowStuffWorks 
 Featured story at Ford.com
 Coverage at CarDesignNews.com

SYNus